Mattias Jons (born 19 November 1982 in Hudiksvall) is a Swedish hammer thrower.

Achievements

References

1982 births
Living people
Swedish male hammer throwers
World Athletics Championships athletes for Sweden
21st-century Swedish people